Winston Anglin (27 August 1962 – 5 September 2004) was a Jamaican international football player.

Club career
Nicknamed Twinny Bug he played for local sides Wadadah F.C., Waterhouse F.C. and Village United F.C. He was one of the island's most consistent, but sharp-tempered midfielders of the 1980s.

International career
He also played 83 times for the Reggae Boyz and scored one goal in Jamaica's 2–0 victory over Trinidad and Tobago in the final of the Shell Caribbean Cup in 1991. Also, he scored twice in a World Cup qualifier against Puerto Rico in 1988.

Drugs offence
However, his career as a national team player ended in 1995 after he was given an 18-month sentence in the US for cocaine trafficking. Anglin was held at New York's JFK International Airport with 103 ballons of the drug in his stomach. He returned to Jamaica shortly after being released on parole and continued to play club football, doing so well that his supporters waged numerous calls for his return to the national team. But his drug conviction and several battles with match officials forced national coaches to ignore his claims for a recall.

Death
Like other former Reggae Boyz stars Stephen Malcolm and Peter Cargill, Anglin was killed in a road accident near Discovery Bay. He died in St Ann's Bay hospital after the car he was travelling in overturned on a rural and unlit highway on Jamaica's north coast, hit a rock and landed upside down. He was returning home after watching Jamaica's World Cup qualifier against Panama at the National Stadium in Kingston. According to police reports, he died from severe trauma to the head and body.

References

External links
News leaves Anglin's mother in disbelief - Jamaica Gleaner
Record at FIFA Tournaments - FIFA

1962 births
2004 deaths
Jamaican footballers
Jamaica international footballers
Waterhouse F.C. players
Jamaican drug traffickers
Road incident deaths in Jamaica
Village United F.C. players
Wadadah F.C. players
1991 CONCACAF Gold Cup players
1993 CONCACAF Gold Cup players
Association football midfielders